Calotes nigriplicatus is a species of agamid lizard. It is endemic to Ambon Island in Indonesia.

References

Calotes
Reptiles of Indonesia
Reptiles described in 2000
Taxa named by Jakob Hallermann